Snowball is a 1960 British drama film directed by Pat Jackson and starring Gordon Jackson, Kenneth Griffith and Zena Walker. It was made at Beaconsfield Studios. The film's sets were designed by the art director Harry Pottle.

Plot
10-year-old Mickey (Dennis Waterman) is late home from school. He tells his parents he was thrown off the school bus by the conductor for not having a ticket, obliging him to walk four miles. The local press makes an issue of the incident and the story snowballs out of control. The conductor, Phil Hart, a former POW with memory problems, is harassed until he collapses on railway tracks and is killed by a train. Mickey finally owns up to lying.

Cast
 Gordon Jackson as Bill Donovan  
 Kenneth Griffith as Phil Hart  
 Zena Walker as Mary Donovan  
 Daphne Anderson as Nora Hart  
 Dennis Waterman as Mickey Donovan 
 John Welsh as Ted Wylie  
 Myrtle Reed as Betty Martin  
 Wensley Pithey as Jim Adams  
 Eric Pohlmann as Editor  
 Ronald Adam as Mr. King
 Roddy McMillan as Jack, 'bus conductor

References

Bibliography
 Goble, Alan. The Complete Index to Literary Sources in Film. Walter de Gruyter, 1999.

External links

1960 films
1960 crime drama films
British black-and-white films
British crime drama films
Films directed by Pat Jackson
Films scored by Clifton Parker
Films shot at Beaconsfield Studios
1960s English-language films
1960s British films